Ivar Bae (29 October 1897 – 18 August 1967) was a Norwegian politician for the Conservative Party.

He was born in Bremsnes.

He was a member of the executive committee of the Kristiansund city council from 1937 to 1940. He was elected to the Norwegian Parliament from the Market towns of Møre og Romsdal county in 1945, but was not re-elected in 1949.

Outside politics, he worked as a banker from 1916 to 1967.

References
 

1897 births
1967 deaths
Conservative Party (Norway) politicians
Members of the Storting
Møre og Romsdal politicians
Politicians from Kristiansund
Norwegian bankers
20th-century Norwegian politicians